Athens is an unincorporated community in the northeastern corner of Howard County, Arkansas, Arkansas, United States. It is located at the junction of Arkansas Highways 84 and 246.

Historic sites

Athens includes (or is the nearest community to) a number of historic places, including the following ones which are all listed on the National Register of Historic Places:
Bard Springs Bathhouse, FS Rd. 106 NW of Athens, Caney Cr. Wildlife Management Area, Ouachita NF
Bard Springs Dam No. 1, FS Rd. 106 NW of Athens, Caney Cr. Wildlife Management Area, Ouachita NF
Bard Springs Dam No. 2, FS Rd. 106 NW of Athens, Caney Cr. Wildlife Management Area, Ouachita NF
Bard Springs Picnic Shelter, FS Rd. 106 NW of Athens, Caney Cr. Wildlife Management Area, Ouachita NF
Buckeye Vista Overlook, Forest Service Rd. 38
Shady Lake Bathhouse, Co. Rd. 64, Caney Cr. Wildlife Management Area, Ouachita NF
Shady Lake Caretaker's House, FS Rd. 38, Caney Cr. Wildlife Management Area, Ouachita NF
Shady Lake Dam, Co. Rd. 64, Caney Cr. Wildlife Management Area, Ouachita NF
Shady Lake Picnic Pavilion, FS Rd. 38, Caney Cr. Wildlife Management Area, Ouachita NF
Sugar Creek Vista Overlook, Forest Service Rd. 38
Tall Peak Fire Tower, FS Rd. 38A NW of Athens, Caney Cr. Wildlife Management Area, Ouachita NF

References

Unincorporated communities in Howard County, Arkansas
Unincorporated communities in Arkansas